U.S. Route 93 Business (US 93 Bus.) is a business route of U.S. Route 93 (US 93) in Clark County, Nevada. The route provides access to Lake Mead and downtown Boulder City from Interstate 11 (I-11). The route was originally part of mainline US 93 before it was realigned around Boulder City along I-11.

Route description

US 93 Bus. begins at an interchange with I-11/US 93 and State Route 172 (SR 172) en route to Hoover Dam. From there, it proceeds northwest heading towards the Lake Mead National Recreation Area. In Boulder City, the route turns southwestward, heading towards downtown Boulder City. The route upgrades to a major arterial highway when upon leaving the urban area. US 93 Bus. ends at an interchange with I-11/US 93/US 95 at Railroad Pass in Henderson.

History
Prior to the construction of I-11, US 93 Bus. had existed as the main route US 93 between Arizona and Las Vegas through Boulder City.

The Nevada Department of Transportation (NDOT) sent a request to the American Association of State Highway and Transportation Officials (AASHTO) to create US 93 Bus. in 2017. AASHTO's Special Committee on U.S. Route Numbering approved the new designation at their meeting on May 23, 2017, concurrently with a relocation of mainline US 93 to the alignment of the I-11 Boulder City Bypass then under construction. By 2019, after completion of the Boulder City Bypass, NDOT had officially designated the business route.

Major intersections

See also

References

External links

93 Business (Boulder City)
Business (Boulder City, Nevada)
93 Business (Boulder City, Nevada)
Transportation in Clark County, Nevada
Transportation in Henderson, Nevada
Lake Mead National Recreation Area
Boulder City, Nevada